Doddanna (born 11 November 1949) is an Indian actor in the Kannada film industry who has acted in about 800 films. He started his career as a theatre actor. During this time, he entered the Kannada film industry as a character actor.

Early life
Doddanna was born on 11 November 1949. The youngest son in the family, He belongs to Lingayat community. he was named after his grandfather Kadle Doddappa.

Career
He has portrayed villains, policemen and other characters. He has been especially successful as a comic actor.

Partial filmography

Kannada

Tamil
Jai (2004)
Ainthaam Padai (2009)

Telugu
Aatagadharaa Siva (2018)

Awards

 Karnataka State Film Award for Best Supporting Actor - 1998-99 Winner for Tuvvi Tuvvi Tuvvi
 South Indian International Movie Awards - 2012 Nominated—SIIMA Award for Best Actor in a Supporting Role for Katari Veera Surasundarangi
 Filmfare Awards South - 2019 Nominated—Filmfare Award for Best Supporting Actor – Telugu for Aatagadharaa Siva
 6th Arsikere Taluk Kannada Sahithya Sammelana President - 2016

References

External links
 

Male actors in Kannada cinema
Indian male film actors
People from Hassan district
Living people
1949 births
20th-century Indian male actors
21st-century Indian male actors
Male actors from Karnataka
Recipients of the Rajyotsava Award 2006